The 1910 Syracuse Orangemen football team represented Syracuse University during the 1910 college football season. The head coach was Tad Jones, coaching his second season with the Orangemen. The team played their home games at Archbold Stadium in Syracuse, New York.

Schedule

References

Syracuse
Syracuse Orange football seasons
Syracuse Orangemen football